Deadly Class is an American television series developed by Rick Remender and Miles Orion Feldsott for Syfy. It is based on the comic book series of the same name created by Remender and Wesley Craig and published by Image Comics. The series stars Benedict Wong, Benjamin Wadsworth, Lana Condor, María Gabriela de Faría, Luke Tennie, Liam James, and Michel Duval. Set in the late 1980s, the series revolves around King's Dominion, an elite private academy where students are trained to become assassins.

The series is produced by Sony Pictures Television, Universal Cable Productions, in association with Gozie AGBO, Chipmunk Hill and Getaway Productions. Anthony Russo and Joe Russo serve as executive producers alongside Remender, Feldsott, Mick Betancourt, Lee Toland Krieger, Mike Larocca, and Adam Targum. In November 2017, casting began for a pilot ordered by Syfy. In April 2018, the series was picked up for an order of 10 episodes. Filming takes place in Vancouver, British Columbia.

The first episode premiered as a special preview online on December 20, 2018 and on Syfy on December 30; the series officially premiered on January 16, 2019. It has received mixed reviews from critics, with many praising the cast, visuals, and choreography while criticizing the tone and pacing. The series was canceled in June 2019.

Premise
Set in a dark, heightened world against the backdrop of late 1980s counterculture, Deadly Class follows a homeless, disillusioned teen, Marcus Lopez Arguello, who is recruited into King's Dominion, a storied elite private school chiefly serving the offspring of the world's top crime families. Maintaining his moral code while surviving a ruthless curriculum, vicious social cliques, and his own adolescent uncertainties soon prove vital for the youth.

Cast

Main
 Benedict Wong as Master Lin, the ruthless, no-nonsense headmaster of King's Dominion
 Benjamin Wadsworth as Marcus Lopez Arguello, King's Dominion's newest addition and Saya's pledge
 Lana Condor as Saya Kuroki, the leader of the Kuroki Syndicate and Marcus's sponsor
 María Gabriela de Faría as Maria Salazar, a member of the Soto Vatos and Chico's former girlfriend
 Luke Tennie as Willie Lewis, leader of the F.W.O. (Final World Order) and Marcus's best friend at King's Dominion
 Liam James as Billy Bennett, a punk rocker who is one of Marcus's best friends and the son of a corrupt, drug smuggling cop
 Michel Duval as Chico, the leader of the Soto Vatos, and Maria's former boyfriend

Recurring

 Taylor Hickson as Petra, a goth hailing from a death cult
 Siobhan Williams as Brandy Lynn, a racist Southern belle and the leader of the Dixie Mob
 Sean Depner as Viktor, notorious as the son of Joseph Stalin's top assassin
 Jack Gillett as Lex Miller, an easygoing outcast
 Isaiah Lehtinen as Shabnam, son of a wealthy banker who is shunned by his peers
 Juan Grey as Juan, a member of Maria's clique Soto Vatos
 Tom Stevens as Chester "Fuckface" Wilson, Marcus's psychopathic bunkmate
 Sam Jin Coates as Yukio, a member of the Kuroki Syndicate and a student at King's Dominion
 Brian Posehn as Dwight Shandy, an aging stoner
 Olivia Cheng as Madame Gao, head of that assassins guild and Master Lin's sister
 David Zayas as El Alma Del Diablo, Chico's father
 Viva Lee as Nahia, Master Lin's daughter
 Victor Andrés Trelles Turgeon as Holy Ghost, El Diablo's enforcer

Guest
 Henry Rollins as Jürgen Denke, former Poison Lab instructor
 Erica Cerra as Miss De Luca, Hand-to-Hand Combat instructor
 Ryan Robbins as Rory Heemsle, homeless man who terrorized and preyed on other homeless individuals
 Graeme Meekison as Jaden, an attending student at King's Dominion
 Theresa Wong as Shu, Master Lin's wife
 Kelcey Mawema as Gabrielle, a young woman who befriends and romances Willie
 Christopher Heyerdahl as Master Zane, combat skills instructor
 French Stewart as Scorpio Slasher, psychopathy instructor
 Chanelle Peloso as Sue Ann, Chester's ally
 Ice-T as himself
 Doralynn Mui as Riku, a top lieutenant in the Kuroki Syndicate

Episodes
Episode titles are taken from punk rock songs of the 1980s.

Production

Principal casting for the pilot of the series was released by Syfy in November 2017, with Benedict Wong, Benjamin Wadsworth, Lana Condor, María Gabriela de Faría, Luke Tennie, Liam James and Michel Duval announced as the pilot's leads. It was picked up to series by Syfy on April 18, 2018, for a planned 2019 debut. The visual effects for the series, including the Las Vegas sequence in Episode 5, were created by FuseFX, CVDVFX, Zoic and One. Six One Eight.

Reception

Critical response
On the review aggregation website Rotten Tomatoes, the series has an approval rating of 64% based on 36 reviews, with an average rating of 6.23/10. The website's critical consensus reads, "Despite well executed action and smart casting, Deadly Class struggles to meet the mark set by other spooky teen shows." Metacritic, which uses a weighted average, assigned a score of 58 out of 100 based on 13 critics, indicating "mixed or average reviews".

Ratings

Notes

References

External links
 

2010s American crime drama television series
2010s American high school television series
2019 American television series debuts
2019 American television series endings
American action television series
English-language television shows
Japan in non-Japanese culture
Syfy original programming
Television series about teenagers
Television series based on Image Comics
Television series by Sony Pictures Television
Television series by Universal Content Productions
Television series set in 1987
Television shows set in San Francisco
Works about Mexican drug cartels
Works about the Yakuza